Group B of the 2006 Fed Cup Americas Zone Group I was one of two pools in the Americas Zone Group I of the 2006 Fed Cup. Four teams competed in a round robin competition, with the top team and the bottom two teams proceeding to their respective sections of the play-offs: the top teams played for advancement to the World Group II Play-offs, while the bottom teams faced potential relegation to Group II.

Brazil vs. Colombia

Puerto Rico vs. Cuba

Brazil vs. Cuba

Puerto Rico vs. Colombia

Brazil vs. Puerto Rico

Cuba vs. Colombia

See also
Fed Cup structure

References

External links
 Fed Cup website

2006 Fed Cup Americas Zone